Throughout its history, many changes in the Grand Slam tennis tournaments have affected the number of titles won by various players. These have included the opening of the French national championships to international players in 1925, the elimination of the challenge round in 1922, and the admission of professional players in 1968 (the start of the Open Era).

All of these tournaments have been listed based on the modern definition of a tennis major, rather than when they were officially recognized by the ILTF. The Grand Slam tournaments are the annual four major tennis events played in the Open Era, which began in 1968, superseding the Amateur Era. The Australian and U.S. tournaments were officially recognized by the ILTF in 1924, and the French Championships followed a year later in 1925 when it became open to all international players. The United States Lawn Tennis Association (USLTA) had several grievances with the ILTF and refused to join when it was formed in 1913.

From 1913 to 1923, there were three official championships recognized by the ILTF:
 World Grass Court Championships – Wimbledon.
 World Hard Court Championships, held in Paris on clay courts.
 World Covered Court Championships, held in Europe on an indoor wood surface.
During that same time period the USLTA recognized the U.S. National Championships
 U.S. National Championships, held in New York on grass.

Champions by year

Champions list
Tournament record and active players indicated in bold. 

 152 champions in 480 events as of the 2023 Australian Open.
 Open Era – 57 champions in 219 events.
 Amateur Era – 98 champions in 261 events.
  Australians Ken Rosewall, Rod Laver and John Newcombe are three players who become champions both in the Amateur Era and in the Open Era.
 Youngest and oldest champions
  Michael Chang – , at 1989 French Open.
  Arthur Gore – , at 1909 Wimbledon. (One match)
  Ken Rosewall – , at 1972 Australian Open. (Open Era)

Grand Slam achievements

These are players who achieved some form of a tennis Grand Slam. They include a Grand Slam, non-calendar year Grand Slam, Career Grand Slam, Career Golden Slam, and Career Super Slam. No male player has won a single season Golden Slam. The tennis Open Era began in 1968, after the Australian Open and before the French Open.

Grand Slam
Players who won all four major titles in a calendar year.

Non-calendar year Grand Slam
Players who won all four major titles consecutively (not in a calendar year).
 The event at which the non-calendar year Grand Slam was completed indicated in bold.

Career Grand Slam
Players who won all four major titles over the course of their careers.
 The event at which the Career Grand Slam was completed indicated in bold.

Career Golden Slam
Players who won all four major titles and the Olympic gold medal over the course of their careers.
 The event at which the Career Golden Slam was completed indicated in bold.

Career Super Slam
Players who won all four major titles, the Olympic gold medal and the Tour Finals over the course of their careers.
 The event at which the Career Super Slam was completed indicated in bold.

Multiple titles in a season

Three titles

Two titles

Tournament statistics

Consecutive titles

Overall record

At one tournament

Grand Slam titles by decade
 Note: Ken Rosewall, Novak Djokovic, and Rafael Nadal are the only male players to win Grand Slam singles titles in three different decades. Nadal is the only player to do so with multiple titles.

1870s

1880s

1890s

1900s

1910s

1920s

1930s

1940s

1950s

1960s

1970s

1980s

1990s

2000s

2010s

2020s

Grand Slam titles by country

All-time

Open Era

See also

List of Grand Slam records lists 
 Chronological list of men's Grand Slam tennis champions
 List of Grand Slam men's singles finals
 List of Grand Slam-related tennis records
 Major professional tennis tournaments before the Open Era
 List of ATP Tour top-level tournament singles champions
 Lists of tennis records and statistics

List of Grand Slam champions 
 List of Grand Slam men's doubles champions
 List of Grand Slam women's singles champions
 List of Grand Slam women's doubles champions
 List of Grand Slam mixed doubles champions
 List of Grand Slam boys' singles champions
 List of Grand Slam girls' singles champions

References 

Men
 
Grand